Nationality law is the law of a sovereign state, and of each of its jurisdictions, that defines the legal manner in which a national identity is acquired and how it may be lost. In international law, the legal means to acquire nationality and formal membership in a nation are separated from the relationship between a national and the nation, known as citizenship. Some nations domestically use the terms interchangeably, though by the 20th century, nationality had commonly come to mean the status of belonging to a particular nation with no regard to the type of governance which established a relationship between the nation and its people. In law, nationality describes the relationship of a national to the state under international law and citizenship describes the relationship of a citizen within the state under domestic statutes. Different regulatory agencies monitor legal compliance for nationality and citizenship. A person in a country of which he or she is not a national is generally regarded by that country as a foreigner or alien. A person who has no recognised nationality to any jurisdiction is regarded as stateless.

Principles
Nationality law can be broadly categorized into three principles: 

 jus soli, or right by birth on the soil; 
 jus sanguinis, or right of the blood; and
 jus matrionii, or right of marriage. 

Laws may be based on any one of these principles, but they commonly reflect a combination of all three principles. Generally speaking, countries in the Americas have a strong jus soli heritage.

Jus soli

Jus soli is the principle, whereby birth on a country's territorial jurisdiction—e.g., land, or in some cases, vessel registered as being registered as under the jurisdiction of that country (aeroplanes, ships)—confers nationality of the country of birth to the child. In most countries, this originated from the English common law tradition that all persons born on the King's land owed an allegiance to the King. This law was inherited by the colonies and subsequently codified into their own domestic laws, such as in the United States, Canada, Australia, etc.

Jus soli laws are not always absolute: sometimes countries with jus soli laws require lawful residence in the country before the authorities will observe this right, such as in Cambodia or Thailand. Sometimes jus soli laws only operate generationally, such as in some Middle-Eastern countries, where a child born in the territory will only acquire nationality if the child's father (regardless of parental nationality) was born in the same territory. Sometimes jus soli will be restricted by age.

There is also an intersection between the principles, wherein only persons of a certain race or blood will acquire nationality at birth. For instance, in Liberia, African-born persons will acquire nationality while those of non-African origin will not be entitled to this privilege.

Jus sanguinis

Jus sanguinis is the principle whereby the nationality of a person is dictated by their blood (i.e., parentage or ancestry). For instance, in Italy, nationality may be transmitted perpetually if one can find an Italian ancestor up until the founding of the Italian state in their lineage. By contrast, other states may restrict their jus sanguinis transmission of nationality up to the registration of the second generation down the family line.

Jus matrimonii
Some states automatically confer nationality on the basis of marriage. A prominent example of a country with jus matrimonii laws is Cape Verde.

The common practice within and among states at the beginning of the 20th century was that a woman should have the nationality of her husband; i.e., upon marrying a foreigner, the wife would automatically acquire the nationality of her husband and lose her previous nationality, often with the reciprocal recognition by the other country. Legal provisions existed that automatically naturalised married women, and sometimes married men as well. This led to a number of problems, such as: loss of the spouses' original nationality; spouses losing the right to consular assistance, as such cannot be provided to nationals under the jurisdiction of a foreign state of which they are also nationals; and men becoming subject to military service obligations.

There has been a shift towards a principle that neither marriage nor dissolution of marriage automatically affecting the nationality of either spouse, nor of a change of nationality by one spouse during marriage automatically affecting the nationality of their spouse. However, in many jurisdictions spouses can still obtain special and fast processing of applications for naturalisation.

Naturalization 

Most states today allow for aliens to acquire a nationality via a process known as naturalization on the basis of long-term residence and other conditions. This process and the conditions it entails are detailed in the states' nationality laws. Some nationality laws have special provisions to make it easier for diaspora populations to become nationals.

Limits to nationality law
By international custom, each sovereign state generally has the right to freely determine who it will recognise as its nationals and citizens. Such determinations may be made by custom, statutory law, case law (precedent), or a combination of either. In some cases, the determination may be governed by public international law—e.g., by treaties and the European Convention on Nationality.

Nevertheless, states' rights to determine who their nationals are is not absolute, and states must comply with their human rights obligations concerning the granting and loss of nationality. In particular, nationals must not be arbitrarily deprived of their nationality. The right to a nationality and the prohibition against depriving one's nationality is codified in article 15 of the "Universal Declaration of Human Rights".

Article 1 of the "Convention on Certain Questions Relating to the Conflict of Nationality Laws" states:

It is for each State to determine under its own law who are its nationals. This law shall be recognised by other States in so far as it is consistent with international conventions, international custom, and the principles of law generally recognised with regard to nationality.

The "Inter-American Court of Human Rights" went further in limiting state's right to determine nationality:

 [T]he manners in which States regulate matters bearing on nationality cannot today be deemed within their sole jurisdiction; [the powers enjoyed by the States in that area] are also circumscribed by their obligations to ensure the full protection of human rights.

Ethnic group-related provisions, by country
The nationality laws of several countries have special provisions in them to simplify naturalization of favored ethnic groups. The laws in these countries appear to reflect a desire by governments to guarantee a safe haven to diaspora populations, particularly those assumed to be living under precarious conditions. A non-exhaustive list of such countries laws follows.

Armenia 
Article 14 of the Constitution of Armenia (1995) provides that "[i]ndividuals of Armenian origin shall acquire nationality of the Republic of Armenia through a simplified procedure." This provision is consistent with the Declaration on Independence of Armenia, issued by the Supreme Soviet of Armenia in 1989, which declared, in article 4, that "Armenians living abroad are entitled to the citizenship of the Republic of Armenia."

Bulgaria 
According to the Constitution of Bulgaria, Article 25(2): "A person of Bulgarian origin shall acquire Bulgarian nationality through a facilitated procedure."

Chapter Two of the Bulgarian Citizenship Act is entitled "Acquisition of Bulgarian Citizenship", the first section of which is entitled "Acquisition of Bulgarian Citizenship by Origin", and provides at article 9 that "[a]ny person...whose descent from a Bulgarian citizen has been established by way of a court ruling shall be a Bulgarian citizen by origin." Separately, article 15 of the Act provides that "[a]ny person who is not a Bulgarian citizen may acquire Bulgarian citizenship...if he/she...is of a Bulgarian origin."

China 

The immigration law of China gives priority to returning Overseas Chinese (i.e., ethnic Chinese who were living abroad). As a result of the intersection between this provision—and other factors such as China's poor human-rights record that discourage foreign nationals in general from wanting to move there—practically all immigrants to China are ethnic Chinese, including many whose families lived outside of China for generations. The Chinese government encourages the return of Overseas Chinese with various incentives not available to others, such as "tax breaks, high salaries and exemptions from the one-child policy if they had two children while living abroad." The "rights and interests of returned overseas Chinese" are afforded special protection according to Articles 50 and 89(12) of the Chinese Constitution.

Hong Kong 
In April 2015, the Hong Kong Government announced a pilot scheme named "Admission Scheme for the Second Generation of Chinese Hong Kong Permanent Residents" (ASSG).

Taiwan 
The immigration law of Taiwan (officially the Republic of China) gives priority to returning Taiwanese and overseas Chinese who are not nationals of the People's Republic of China, Chinese who were living abroad, and encourages their return. However, although Republic of China have not ceded the claim on mainland China, the government does not consider the people in mainland China, Hong Kong and Macau as Republic of China nationals.

Overseas ethnic Chinese can register as Republic of China national and apply for a Republic of China passport, however, they do not automatically have a right of return to Taiwan area if they don't have a household registration there.

Not all Republic of China nationals have a right of return to Taiwan area even if they hold a Republic of China passport—specifically, those without a household registration in Taiwan area do not automatically have the right of return, may be refused entry, removed or deported from Taiwan area, and an entry permit is needed before 2011.

Czech Republic 
The Czech Republic grants nationality—and thus the right of residence—to anyone whose parents are or were Czech nationals, unless the individual is also a national of a country that has a treaty with the Czech Republic barring dual nationality of the Czech Republic and that country. Moreover, people of Czech origin might be granted the right to permanent residence (Czech origin is a reason worth of consideration).

In 1995, the Czech Republic amended its Nationality Law to provide the Interior Ministry with the discretion to waive the usual five-year residency requirement for foreigners that had been resettled in the Czech Republic by 31 December 1994. This amendment was aimed particularly at several hundred ethnic Czechs which had been brought by the Czech government from the Ukrainian region of Volhynia, and was of a limited duration. The amendment was consistent with what the Czech Ministry of Labor and Social Affairs has identified as "the Czech government's policy principles regarding the resettlement of foreigners of Czech origin living abroad." A private fund, the People In Need Czech TV Foundation, worked with government authorities between 1995 and 2001 to effect this resettlement in the specific instance of Russian and Kazakh nationals of Czech origin, and had resettled approximately 750 such persons as of 2000.

Finland 
The Finnish Aliens Act provides for persons who are of Finnish origin to receive permanent residence. It is usually Ingrian Finns from the former Soviet Union who exercise this right, though American, Canadian, and Swedish nationals with Finnish ancestry are eligible.

The Finnish Immigration Service states that, under certain conditions, persons with "Finnish roots" or an otherwise "close connection to Finland" may receive a residence permit in Finland without the requirement of any further grounds (e.g., work or studies). Receiving a residence permit depends on the directness and closeness of Finnish ancestry. If the ancestry dates back several generations, a residence permit cannot be granted on this basis.

According to the Immigration Service, people who may be granted a residence permit based on these conditions can be divided into the following three groups:

 former Finnish nationals
 persons of other Finnish origin, including those who have at least one parent or grandparent who has been a native Finnish national.
 persons who either were evacuated from Ingria or served in the Finnish army in 1939–1945. This group includes persons from areas of the former Soviet Union who have been determined to be of Finnish nationality by Soviet or post-Soviet authorities; or who have at least one parent or two grandparents who have been determined to be of Finnish nationality in official documents (e.g., in their internal passports). This group also includes all persons who were transferred to Finland between 1943–1943 from areas occupied by Germany and were subsequently returned to Soviet Union; or who served in the Finnish Defence Forces during the Second World War qualify. To qualify for permanent residence permit, the persons in this group must have a basic knowledge of spoken and written Finnish or Swedish. The knowledge is tested in pre-immigration training and in a subsequent language test. In addition, they must have a pre-arranged permanent residence in Finland, but the labour authorities assist in finding an apartment.

Greece 
Various phenomena throughout Greek history (e.g., the extensive colonization by classical Greek city states; the vast expansion of Greek culture in Hellenistic times; the large dominions at times held by the Greek-speaking Byzantine Empire; and the energetic trading activity by Greeks under the Ottomans) all tended to create Greek communities far beyond the boundaries of modern Greece.

Recognizing this situation, Greece grants nationality to broad categories of people of ethnic Greek ancestry who are members of the Greek diaspora, including individuals and families whose ancestors have been resident in diaspora communities outside the modern state of Greece for centuries or millennia.

"Foreign persons of Greek origin," who neither live in Greece, hold Greek nationality, or were necessarily born there may become Greek nationals by enlisting in Greece's military forces, under article 4 of the Code of Greek Citizenship, as amended by the Acquisition of Greek Nationality by Aliens of Greek Origin Law (Law 2130/1993).  Anyone wishing to do so must present a number of documents, including "[a]vailable written records...proving the Greek origin of the interested person and his ancestors."

India 
A Person of Indian Origin (PIO) is a person living outside of India and without Indian nationality, but of Indian origin up to four generations removed. It is available to persons of Indian origin anywhere in the world as long as they have never been nationals of Pakistan or of Bangladesh (a reservation excluding Muslims who joined Pakistan during or after the 1947 partition). This unusual type of nationality by descent is an intermediate form of nationality in that it does not grant the full portfolio of rights enjoyed by Indian citizens.

The Citizenship (Amendment) Act 2003 and Citizenship (Amendment) Ordinance 2005 make provision for an even newer form of Indian nationality, the holders of which are to be known as Overseas Citizens of India (OCI). Overseas nationality is not substantially different from PIO rights. Holding either PIO or OCI status does, however, facilitate access to full Indian citizenship. An OCI who has been registered for five years, for instance, need be resident for only one year in India before becoming a full national.

Ireland 

Irish nationality law provides for acquisition on the basis of at least one Irish grandparent. Note that, for the purposes of Irish nationality law, a person born anywhere on the island of Ireland is considered "Irish." (The island includes Northern Ireland, which is part of the United Kingdom, where British nationality law applies; thus, people born in Northern Ireland are entitled to both British and Irish nationality.) 

The entitlement to nationality of all people born on Ireland and its islands was stipulated by the 1922 Constitution of the Irish Free State and the 1937 Constitution of Ireland, and reinforced by the 1998 Belfast Agreement. A person born outside of Ireland with entitlement to Irish nationality through a grandparent born in Ireland may pass that right on to her or his own children. To do so, however, that person must register her or his birth in Ireland's Foreign Births Register prior to the children's births. Irish law also automatically grants nationality at birth to any individual born abroad to a parent who was born in Ireland, without the need to register with the DFA prior to the granting of citizen's rights like holding an Irish passport.

Separately from this right, the Irish minister responsible for immigration may dispense with conditions of naturalisation to grant nationality to an applicant who "is of Irish descent or Irish associations," under section 15 of the Irish Nationality and Citizenship Act, 1986. With rare exceptions the applicant must be resident in the island of Ireland before applying for naturalisation.

Israel 

The Law of Return is legislation enacted by Israel in 1950, that gives all Jews, persons of Jewish ancestry up to at least one Jewish grandparent, and spouses of Jews the right to immigrate to and settle in Israel and obtain nationality, and obliges the Israeli government to facilitate their immigration. Originally, the law applied to Jews only, until a 1970 amendment stated that the rights "are also vested in a child and a grandchild of a Jew, the spouse of a Jew, the spouse of a child of a Jew and the spouse of a grandchild of a Jew." This resulted in several hundreds of thousands of persons qualifying for immigration to Israel (mainly from the former Soviet Union) but not being recognized as Jews by the Israeli religious authorities, which on the basis of halakha recognize only the child of a Jewish mother as being Jewish. People who would be otherwise eligible for this law can be excluded if they can reasonably be considered to constitute a danger to the welfare of the state, have a criminal past, or are wanted fugitives in their countries with the exception of persecution victims. Jews who convert to another religion also lose the right of return. Since 1950 2,734,245 Jews have immigrated to Israel.

Japan 
A special visa category exists exclusively for foreign descendants of Japanese emigrates (nikkeijin) up to the third generation, which provides for long-term residence, unrestricted by occupation, but most nikkeijin cannot automatically acquire Japanese nationality, and must instead go through the process of naturalization. However, the Minister of Justice can waive the age and residence requirements if an applicant for naturalization has a special relationship to Japan, such as a Japanese parent.

Norway 
The Kola Norwegians were Norwegians who settled along the coastline of the Russian Kola Peninsula from approximately 1850 to the closure of the border in the 1920s. It is estimated that around 1000 Norwegians lived on the Kola peninsula in 1917. The Kola Norwegians were deported to or put in camps in other parts of Russia during the course of World War II.

It was only after 1990 that many of the Kola Norwegians again dared to emphasize their background. Only a few had been able to maintain a rusty knowledge of Norwegian. Some of them have migrated back to Norway. There are special provisions in the Norwegian rules of immigration and nationality which eases this process for many Kola Norwegians. These provisions are in general stricter than in some other countries giving "Right of return." In order to obtain a permit to immigrate and work in Norway a Kola Norwegian will have to prove an adequate connection to Norway such as having at least two grandparents from Norway. Citizenship will then be awarded according to regular rules. As of 2004 approximately 200 Kola Norwegians had moved back to Norway.

Philippines 
Republic Act No. 9225, approved 29 August 2003, provided that all Philippine nationals who become nationals of another country shall be deemed not to have lost their Philippine nationality. It further states that natural-born Filipinos who have lost their Philippine nationality in this manner may repatriate by taking an oath of allegiance to the Republic, and that their children whether legitimate, illegitimate or adopted, below 18 years of age, shall be deemed nationals of the Philippines.

Russia 
Russia offers citizenship to individuals descended from Russian ancestors who can demonstrate an affinity for Russian culture and, preferably, speak Russian. Concern about Russia's shrinking population prompted the program. This has had a positive effect because this has not only reversed Russia's population decline but has also increased the birth rate. Officials estimate that 25 million members of the Russian diaspora are eligible for nationality. The Foreign Ministry has sent emissaries to countries around the world to urge the descendants of Russian emigrants to return home.  The majority of these emigrants have returned from Ukraine, many of them young men looking for better education and job opportunities. The Crimean War in 2014 triggered a mass exodus of ethnic Russians living in Crimea.

Spain 
There are three categories of Spanish nationality:

 de origen ('original')
 por residencia ('by residence')
 por opción ('by choice')

De origen is (almost exclusively) acquired at the moment of birth, mainly to a Spanish parent, and can never be lost. Por residencia is acquired through a predetermined period of legal residency in Spain. This distinction is important because Spanish nationality laws primarily follow iure sanguinis, including those relating to the right of return.

The third category, por opción ('by choice'), is given to some people of Spanish origins that, though not complying with the requisites to attain nationality through origin, are able to prove close ties to Spain; this option is given mainly to the children of people that have attained or recovered Spanish nationality after their birth, but it has age limits and one must exercise this choice prior turning 20 (in some countries, like Argentina, prior turning 23, as majority of age is attained at 21 there). Most of the por opción clauses do not confer original status (except those included in the Historical Memory Law), thus it can be lost, and, in case one possesses nationality other than those described below as historically related to Spain (e.g., United States), renounce their current nationality in front of Spanish consular officials.

In practice this renunciation has little practical effect, and in some cases no effect, as only renunciations made to one's own country's officials has an effect on the linked nationality. The Historical Memory Law which took effect in December 2008, introduced temporary two-year changes to current Spanish nationality laws. Those whose father or mother were born original Spaniards (regardless of their place of birth, whether they are still living, or whether they currently hold Spanish nationality) and those whose grandparents emigrated due to political or economic reasons will have the right to de origen Spanish nationality. Until and while the Law of Historic Memory takes effect, the following laws will also apply:

 Natural-born Spanish emigrants (mainly exiles from the Spanish Civil War and economic migrants) and their children are eligible to recover their de origen Spanish nationality without the requirement of residence in Spain. They also have the right to maintain any current nationality they possess.
 Regardless of their place of birth, the adult children and grandchildren of original Spaniards (original Spaniards are those who, at the moment of their birth, were born to people who possessed Spanish citizenship) can also access Spanish nationality on softer terms than other foreigners: they require just 1 year of legal residence, and they are exempted from work restrictions. This law in practice also benefits the great-grandchildren of emigrant Spaniards as long as their grandparents (born outside of Spain) are/were original Spaniards.
 Ibero-Americans and nationals of other countries historically related to Spain (Portugal, Andorra, Philippines, and Equatorial Guinea) also have a Right of Return: They can apply to Spanish nationality after 2 years of legal residence (the usual time is 10 years for most foreigners) and they have the right to keep their birth nationality.
 Those of Sephardic Jewish origin also have the right to apply for nationality after a year of legal residency in Spain. Since the rediscovery of Sephardi Jews during the campaigns of General Juan Prim in Northern Africa, the Spanish government has taken friendly measures towards the descendants of the Jews expelled from Spain in 1492 under the Alhambra Decree and persecuted by the Spanish Inquisition. The motivation for these measures was a desire to repair a perceived injustice, the need of a collaborative base of natives in Spanish Morocco, and an attempt to attract the sympathy of wealthy European Sephardis like the Pereiras of France. The Alhambra Decree was revoked.

In November 2012, the Spanish government announced that it would eliminate the residency period for Sephardic Jews, and permit them to maintain dual nationality, on the condition that such naturalization applicants presented a certificate of their Sephardic status from the Federation of Jewish Communities in Spain.

Spanish diplomacy exercised protection over Sephardis of the Ottoman Empire and the independent Balkanic states succeeding it. The government of Miguel Primo de Rivera decreed in 1924 that every Sephardi could claim Spanish nationality. This right was used by some refugees during the Second World War, including the Hungarian Jews saved by Ángel Sanz Briz and Giorgio Perlasca. This decree was again put to use to receive some Jews from Sarajevo during the Bosnian War.

In October 2006, the Andalusian Parliament asked the three parliamentary groups that form the majority to support an amendment that would ease the way for Morisco descendants to gain Spanish nationality. The proposal was originally made by IULV-CA, the Andalusian branch of the United Left. Such a measure might have benefited an indeterminate number of people, particularly in Morocco. However, the call went unheeded by the central Spanish authorities.

Ukraine 

According to Ukrainian law, anyone who was a citizen of the Ukrainian Soviet Socialist Republic who was residing in Ukraine at the time of its declaration of independence and any stateless person living on the territory of Ukraine at the moment of its declaration of independence was granted nationality. Anyone born abroad to at least one parent with Ukrainian nationality, including permanent residents of Ukraine, is entitled to Ukrainian nationality. Children born within the territory of Ukraine to at least one Ukrainian parent, stateless persons with at least one Ukrainian grandparent, and children adopted by Ukrainian citizens are also eligible to become nationals.

United Kingdom 
The British Nationality Act 1948 conferred full and equal nationality and settlement rights in Britain on all 800 million subjects of the worldwide British Empire.  The Commonwealth Immigrants Act 1968, amending legislation passed in 1962, removed the right of entry from 200,000 south Asians long resident in British East Africa who had become the victims of the Africanization drive in newly independent Kenya and wished to move to Britain. The act required "substantial connection" to Britain, defined as:

Further provisions extended rights to stepchildren. The wording of this legislation refers to 'Citizenship', 'Naturalisation' and 'Residence', and at no point refers to any specific ethnicity or ethnic group. Announcing his support for right of return legislation in Britain, Member of Parliament Quintin Hogg stated that, "All the great nations of the earth have what the Jews call a Diaspora," and affirmed that nations "special and residual obligation(s) toward them," which include recognizing their right to nationality.

The Immigration Act 1971 affirmed the principles of the 1968 legislation, giving the right of immigration to the grandchildren of British nationals and nationals born in the Commonwealth nations.  It was in effect long enough to enable the descendants of ethnic Britons to return to Britain from the former colonies.

The British Nationality Act 1981 differentiated between British nationality, British Overseas Citizenship, and British Dependent Territory Citizenship, recognizing the right of settlement only for British nationals. It is notable that it was enacted after the contraction of the Empire was completed, and was offered to all substantial populations of descendants of ethnic Britons in the former colonies.

United States 
The Immigration and Nationality Act of 1965, the latest of a series of such Acts, establishes nationality law of the United States. This is codified in Chapter 12 of Title 8 of the U.S. Code, in which section 101(a)(22) states that the term "national of the United States" means:

The explanatory comments of this section, when originally written in 1940, provided clarification that all citizens were nationals of the United States but not all nationals were citizens.

Other countries 

 Belarus: The Citizenship Act of the Republic of Belarus (2002) states that permanent-residence term requirements may be waived for ethnic Belarusians and descendants of ethnic Belarusians born abroad.
 Croatia: Article 11 of Croatia's law on nationality defines emigrants, and provides privileges by excluding them from certain conditions imposed on others. The Croatian diaspora makes use of this to obtain dual nationality or to return to Croatia.
 Estonia: Article 36 (3) of the Constitution of Estonia states that "Every Estonian is entitled to settle in Estonia."
 Ghana: Ghana's right of abode law allows for people of African descent to settle in the country.
 Hungary: In 2010, Hungary passed a law granting nationality and the right of return to descendants of Hungarians living mostly on the former territory of the Hungarian Kingdom and now residing in Hungary's neighbouring countries. Slovakia, which has 500,000 ethnic Magyar citizens (10% of its population) objected vociferously.
 Iraq: see Iraqi nationality law.
 Kazakhstan: see Oralman.
 Lithuania: From the Constitution of Lithuania, Article 32(4): "Every Lithuanian person may settle in Lithuania."
 Poland: From the Constitution of Poland, Article 52(5): "Anyone whose Polish origin has been confirmed in accordance with statute may settle permanently in Poland." (see Polish nationality law.)
 Portugal: On April 12, 2013, the Portuguese parliament approved unanimously an amendment to its nationality laws which would permit the descendants of Jews expelled from Portugal in the 16th century to become Portuguese citizens.
 Romania: Romania extends nationality to all former nationals, as well as to the children and grandchildren of those who have lost their Romanian nationality, regardless of ethnic background.
 South Korea: "Overseas Korean" are eligible for dual nationality.
 Serbia: Article 23 of the 2004 nationality law provides that the descendants of emigrants from Serbia, or ethnic Serbs residing abroad, may take up nationality upon written declaration.

See also
 Immigration law
 Foreign born
 Citizenship Act (disambiguation)
 History of citizenship
 Dual nationality
 Passport
 Political asylum
 Human migration

References